Charles Edward Share (March 14, 1927 – June 7, 2012) was an American basketball player. Share has the distinction of being the first NBA draft pick ever: Share was the No. 1 draft pick in the first organized National Basketball Association draft on April 25, 1950. Share was selected by the Boston Celtics as the No. 1 overall pick in the inaugural 1950 NBA draft.

Early life
Share attended Western Hills High School in Cincinnati, Ohio. He had an injured ankle and did not begin playing basketball until his junior year at Western Hills.

College career

Share attended Bowling Green State University in Bowling Green, Ohio, after being recruited by Coach Harold Anderson. He was named a 1950 All-American his senior year.

Share graduated as the Bowling Green College Falcons' all-time scoring leader with 1,730 points. With Share, Bowling Green won 28 games in 1946-47, 27 games in 1947-48, 24 games in 1948-49 and 19 games in 1949-50. Share has his career-high 39 points against Loyola (Calif.) on Dec. 22, 1949 in Madison Square Garden.

NBA career

Celtics/Waterloo Hawks
Share was drafted by the Celtics, whose fans wanted the team to draft local Holy Cross star, Bob Cousy with the pick. The Celtics' new Coach Red Auerbach defended the unpopular pick of Share, saying "We need a big man. Little men are a dime a dozen. I'm supposed to win, not go after local yokels."

In an irony, future Hall of Famer Cousy ended up being drafted third by the Tri-Cities Blackhawks. Cousy then balked at playing in Moline, Illinois, eventually forcing his rights to be sold to the Chicago Stags. The Stags then folded before the season and the Celtics chose Cousy in the dispersal draft.

For his part, Share did not sign with the Celtics. Instead he signed with the Waterloo Hawks in the fledgling National Professional Basketball League (1950–51), playing for Coach Jack Smiley. Share averaged 11.0 points for the Hawks, playing in 19 games. The NPBL, composed of some former NBA teams in small markets and new teams in major markets, folded after the season.

Then on April 26, 1951, Share's rights were traded by the Celtics to the Fort Wayne Pistons for future Hall of Famer Bill Sharman, who had refused to sign with the Pistons.

In two-and-a-half seasons  with Fort Wayne, Share averaged 4.2 points and 5.1 rebounds in limited playing time.

St. Louis: 3 NBA Finals, Championship
On December 21, 1953, Share was traded by the Fort Wayne Pistons to the Milwaukee Hawks for Max Zaslofsky.

In seven seasons with the Milwaukee/St Louis Hawks, Share averaged a near double-double of 9.2 points and 9.9 rebounds. His role as a rebounding force in the middle, setting screens and playing strong defense freed Naismith Basketball Hall of Fame teammates Bob Pettit, Ed Macauley, Cliff Hagan and Slater Martin to better play their games. Share was named as the team captain and the Hawks made the NBA Finals against the Celtics for three consecutive years.

Share was the captain of the 1958 NBA champion St. Louis Hawks team. In the 1958 NBA Finals victory against the Celtics, Share averaged 6.2 points and 6.0 rebounds in the six game series, in a key reserve role.

On February 1, 1960, the Hawks traded Share, Nick Mantis and Willie Merriweather to the Minneapolis Lakers for Larry Foust. Initially, Share refused to go to the Lakers, but he reconsidered and went to Minneapolis in time for the playoffs. The Lakers were eventually defeated by the Hawks in the Western Division Finals.

Share then retired at the end of the 1959-1960 season.

Overall, Share played nine years in the NBA for the Fort Wayne Pistons, Milwaukee/St. Louis Hawks and the Minneapolis Lakers. He played 596 games, with 4,928 points and 4,986 rebounds. His career averages were 8.3 points and 8.4 rebounds. Share led the NBA in disqualifications during the 1954–55 season.

Personal life
After retiring from basketball, Share never left the St. Louis area and pursued business ventures. Share started Sharick Packaging, Inc.and then sold Sharick in 1985. He then formed Sylvan-Edge Farm with his wife, Rose.

Share died on June 7, 2012 in Chesterfield, Missouri, at age 85. He had lived in Creve Coeur, Missouri and was survived by his wife Rose and daughters Ann and Cindy.

Honors

 Share was inducted into the St. Louis Sports Hall of Fame in 2017.
 Share was inducted into the Bowling Green State University Athletics Hall of Fame in 1964.

References

External links
Career statistics

1927 births
2012 deaths
All-American college men's basketball players
American men's basketball players
Basketball players from Akron, Ohio
Boston Celtics draft picks
Bowling Green Falcons men's basketball players
Centers (basketball)
Fort Wayne Pistons players
Milwaukee Hawks players
Minneapolis Lakers players
St. Louis Hawks players
Waterloo Hawks players